USS Wild Goose II (SP-891), later USS SP-891, was a United States Navy patrol vessel in service from 1917 to 1920.

Wild Goose II was built as a wooden-hulled civilian motorboat of the same name by W. H. Chamberlain at Marblehead, Massachusetts. On 7 July 1917, the U.S. Navy took delivery of her from her owner, Winthrop C. Winslow of Boston, Massachusetts, for use as a section patrol craft during World War I. She entered service as USS Wild Goose II (SP-891), although no record of her commissioning has been found.

Little is known of Wild Goose IIs career. She probably was assigned to the 1st Naval District in northern New England, as her ships post office address is known to have been in that district as of 1 November 1918. In accordance with an order dated 11 April 1918, the Navy renamed her USS SP-891 to avoid confusion with the patrol vessel  that was in commission at the same time.

SP-891 was stricken from the Navy List in 1920.

References

SP-891 Wild Goose II at Department of the Navy Naval History and Heritage Command Online Library of Selected Images: U.S. Navy Ships -- Listed by Hull Number "SP" #s and "ID" #s -- World War I Era Patrol Vessels and other Acquired Ships and Craft numbered from SP-800 through SP-899
NavSource Online: Section Patrol Craft Photo Archive: SP-891 ex-Wild Goose II (SP 891)

Patrol vessels of the United States Navy
World War I patrol vessels of the United States
Ships built in Marblehead, Massachusetts